Lagaan: Once Upon a Time in India is a 2001 Indian Hindi epic sports drama film written and directed by Ashutosh Gowariker. The film was produced by Aamir Khan, who stars alongside debutant Gracy Singh and British actors Rachel Shelley and Paul Blackthorne. Set in 1893, during the late Victorian period of India's colonial British Raj, the film follows the inhabitants of a village in Central India, who, burdened by high taxes and several years of drought, are challenged by an arrogant British Indian Army officer to a game of cricket as a wager to avoid paying the taxes they owe. The villagers face the arduous task of learning a game that is alien to them and play for a victory.

It faced multiple challenges during production: Khan was initially skeptical to star in a sports film, and later, prospective producers called for budget cuts and script modifications. Eventually, the film would become the maiden project of Aamir Khan Productions, and mark Khan's foray into film production. Gowariker was inspired by aspects of the sports drama Naya Daur (1957) in developing the film. The language featured in the film was based on Awadhi, but was diluted with standard Hindi for modern audiences. Principal photography took place in villages near Bhuj. Nitin Chandrakant Desai served as art director, while Bhanu Athaiya was the costume designer. The original soundtrack was composed by A. R. Rahman, with lyrics written by Javed Akhtar.

Lagaan was theatrically released in India on 15 June 2001, clashing with Gadar: Ek Prem Katha. It received critical acclaim for Gowariker's direction, Khan's performance and the film's anti-imperialist stance. With earnings of  during its initial release, the film was the third highest-grossing Hindi film of 2001. Lagaan was screened at numerous international film festivals and garnered multiple accolades. It was the third Indian film to be nominated for the Academy Award for Best Foreign Language Film after Mother India (1957) and Salaam Bombay! (1988). Lagaan became the most-awarded film at the 47th Filmfare Awards with eight wins, including Best Film, Best Director for Gowariker and Best Actor for Khan. At the 49th National Film Awards, the film won eight awards, including Best Popular Film.

Plot 
The farmers of Champaner, in the British Central Provinces, depend on monsoon rains for their livelihood. A delayed start to the monsoon has them worried and they head to the ruling British cantonment, to ask the king for an exemption from the year's tax (lagaan). 

A cricket match is underway between British officers. A young farmer named Bhuvan, provokes them by calling cricket a "childish game". Following the match, the local Raja (king) rejects the farmers' plea, but Andrew Russell, the captain of the British regiment, steps in. He offers a wager in exchange for the farmers playing against his team in a match of cricket. Should they win, he would cancel their tax for the next two years. Bhuvan is made to decide for the village, and agrees when Andrew raises the stakes. 

The village elders are nervous at the prospect of losing the game and being required to pay triple the usual tax. Bhuvan refuses to apologise to Andrew or retract his decision, so the match must be played. Andrew's sister, Elizabeth, takes pity on the farmers. She offers to teach them the game in the interest of fairness. Bhuvan starts gathering a team of players for the match. 

An unruly competitor, named Lakha, is part of Bhuvan's team. He has a grudge with him for their common interest in Gauri, daughter of the village medic. He informs Andrew of his sister's actions. Andrew forbids Elizabeth from leaving the cantonment. He is unaware that she has grown attached to the farmers and is also developing romantic feelings for Bhuvan. She continues sneaking out with the aid of local staff, and even attends a village festival. Gauri, who is secretly in love with Bhuvan, starts to grow envious of her.

The match-day dawns and the ground fills with spectators from neighbouring villages. The British team bat first (see also: Rules of cricket). The farmers must score one run more than the British before the match ends in three days. Smith and Burton begin well, with Smith getting a reprieve due to a Deva no-ball. However, the farmers fight back with Bhura running Smith out and Goli bowling out Burton. Andrew and Brooks bat well and end the day at 182/2. The farmers find out about Lakha's betrayal and he is almost killed, before Bhuvan saves him. Lakha takes a diving catch to dismiss Brooks on the second day.  Their inexperience shows, however, as their batsmen start getting dismissed early on while playing rashly. Bhuvan steadies the innings and takes the match into the third day. On the final morning, the farmers must achieve the score with weak batsmen remaining. Bhuvan plays sensibly, and the match enters the last over. Kachra, the striking player, scores one run off the last ball, but it is not enough to win. The British field umpire signals a no-ball (illegal delivery), causing it to be replayed. Bhuvan scores six runs off the next ball and wins the match for the farmers. 

Elizabeth rushes to the grounds to find Bhuvan. She is heartbroken when she sees him tightly embracing Gauri, and returns to the cantonment. In the next few weeks, the British Empire orders disbandment of the regiment for the humiliation caused by losing to commoners. The tax collection is cancelled for three years, and Andrew is relocated to Africa for his improper management of the Treasury's funds. As her caravan departs, Elizabeth steps out to meet the villagers for the last time. Bhuvan remains unaware of her feelings for him, but thanks her for her help. She bids the villagers farewell and returns to England, choosing to remain unmarried, while Bhuvan marries Gauri in a grand ceremony in the village.

Cast 

 Aamir Khan as Bhuvan Latha (captain and all-rounder)
 Gracy Singh as Gauri
 Rachel Shelley as Elizabeth Russell
 Paul Blackthorne as Captain Andrew Russell
 Suhasini Mulay as Yashoda Maa, Bhuvan's mother
 Kulbhushan Kharbanda as Raja Puran Singh Chawla
 Rajendra Gupta as Mukhiya Ji
 Raghubir Yadav as Bhura (fielder)
 Rajesh Vivek as Guran (all-rounder)
 Raj Zutshi as Ismail (batsman)
 Pradeep Rawat as Deva Singh Sodhi (all-rounder)
 Akhilendra Mishra as Arjan (batsman), the blacksmith
 Daya Shankar Pandey as Goli (seamer), the man with the largest piece of land
 Shrivallabh Vyas as Ishwar (wicket-keeper), the vaidya (doctor) in the village and Gauri's father
 Yashpal Sharma as Lakha (batsman), the woodcutter
 Amin Hajee as Bagha (batsman), the mute drummer
 Aditya Lakhia as Kachra (spinner)
 Javed Khan as Ram Singh, Indian who works with British and helps Elizabeth in translating villagers language
 A. K. Hangal as Shambu Kaka
 Amin Gazi as Tipu
 John Rowe as Colonel Boyer
 David Gant as Major Warren
 Thor Halland as Captain Roberts
 Jeremy Child as Major Cotton
Chris England as Lt Yardley, an English fast bowler. England also wrote a book about his experience making the film titled Balham to Bollywood
Howard Lee as Lt Burton, English wicketkeeper batsman
Ben Nealon as Lt Patrick Smith, Deputy and English all-rounder
Simon Holmes as Lt Brookes, an English batsman
Ray Eves as Lt Willis, an English fast bowler
Jon House as Lt North, an English batsman
Neil Patrick as Lt Harrisson, an English all-rounder
Jamie Whitby Coles as Lt Wesson, an English all-rounder
Barry Hart as Lt Benson, an English spinner
Alex Shirtclliff as Lt Flynn, an English batsman

Production

Development 
Lagaan was inspired by Naya Daur (1957), a sports drama film directed by B. R. Chopra, written by Akhtar Mirza and Kamil Rashid, and starring Dilip Kumar, Vyjayanthimala and Ajit Khan.

Director Gowariker has stated that it was almost impossible to make Lagaan. He went to Khan, who agreed to participate after hearing the detailed script. Khan had initially rejected the idea of a "sporty" film, but was "himself in tears" upon hearing the full dialogued script. Even after securing Khan, Gowariker had trouble finding a producer. Producers who showed interest in the script wanted budget cuts as well as script modifications. Eventually, Khan agreed to Gowariker's suggestion that he would produce the film. Khan corroborated this by saying that the faith he had in Gowariker, the story and script of the film, and the opportunity of starting his own production company inspired him to produce Lagaan. He also said that by being a producer himself, he was able to give greater creative freedom to Gowariker. He cited an example:
"If the director tells the producer that he wants 50 camels, the latter will probably say, 'Why not 25? Can't you manage with 25 camels?' Whereas, if he is telling me the same thing... I will not waste time asking him questions because I am also creatively aware why he needs them."

Jhamu Sughand co-produced the film because he liked the emotional and patriotic story.

Casting 
Gowariker first thought of having Shah Rukh Khan, Bobby Deol, Hrithik Roshan and Abhishek Bachchan for the role of Bhuvan. After Bachchan chose to enter cinema with J. P. Dutta's Refugee (2000), Khan was approached with the idea.

Several actresses had offered to act in the film, but Khan needed someone who matched the description of the character given in the script. After considering Rani Mukerji who did not have dates to accommodate the film, Sonali Bendre, Nandita Das, Shamita Shetty and Ameesha Patel were approached for the role, Gowariker selected Singh for the female lead because he was convinced that she was a good actress and dancer and resembled actress Vyjayanthimala. Singh, a newcomer, devoted all her time to the film. Since the script also demanded a British cast, Gowariker and Khan hired Danielle Roffe as one of the casting directors. After Danielle and Gowariker screen-tested many, Shelley and Blackthorne were chosen for the prime roles. Overall, the film cast 15 foreign actors.

Raghubir Yadav played the role of the legendary Haji Nasruddin in the teleplay Mullah Nasiruddin and has given many memorable performances such as Mungerilal Ke Haseen Sapne. Yadav was selected for the role of Bhura, a poultry farmer, based on his performance in Earth (1998). He had undergone an appendectomy operation in-between the filming schedule and returned to complete some of his scenes. Rajesh Vivek, who played the fortune teller Guran, was spotted by Gowariker in the film Junoon (1978). His liking for cricket helped him in his role. Raj Zutshi friendship with Khan and association in several films brought him the role of Ismail the potter after auditions. Pradeep Rawat's association with Khan in Sarfarosh (1999) brought him the role of Deva, a Sikh ex-sepoy, which was initially intended for Mukesh Rishi. Rawat claimed that it was the highest ever compensation he received in his career. Daya Shankar Pandey, who preferred the role of Kachra, was known to Khan and Gowariker through previous films (Pehla Nasha (1993), Baazi (1995) and Ghulam (1998)). Pandey credited Gowariker for his acting in the film as Goli, saying that Gowariker and he would discuss the required emotions and expressions before shooting.

Yashpal Sharma was chosen by Gowariker for the role of Lakha, the woodcutter, after his portrayal in Samar (1999). He said it was a good experience working with Khan and Gowariker during the film. Amin Hajee earlier worked in a film with Gowariker. The friendly association brought Gowariker to him with the script, which he liked, and thereafter he successfully auditioned for his role of Bagha, a mute drummer. His knowledge of mute people and some assistance from a music band helped him better prepare for his role. Gowariker, who believed that Amin was like Sylvester Stallone, would refer to him as Stallone during filming. Aditya Lakhia's association with Gowariker in Kabhi Haan Kabhi Naa (1993) and Pehla Nasha (1993) brought him the role of Kachra, the untouchable. He read the book Everybody Loves a Good Drought by P. Sainath to better understand and portray his character.

Pre-production 
One of the first members to join the production team was Nitin Chandrakant Desai, the art director, with whom Gowariker set out for extensive location hunt throughout India, to find the setting for the fictional town of Champaner, in late 1998. After searching through Rajasthan, Nasik, UP, they zeroed in on an ancient village near Bhuj, located in Gujarat's Kutch district, by May 1999, where the film was primarily shot.

The script demanded a dry location: an agricultural village where it had not rained in several years. To depict the 1890s era, the crew also required a village which lacked electricity, communication and automobiles. Kutch faced the same problems at that time and hence the village of Kunariya, located a few miles away from Bhuj, was chosen. During the filming of Lagaan, it did not rain at all in the region. However, a week after the shoot finished, it rained heavily bringing relief to Bhuj, which had a lean monsoon the previous year. The typical old Kutch hamlet was built by the local people four months before the arrival of the crew. The 2001 Gujarat earthquake devastated this region and displaced many locals. The crew, including the English, contributed to their cause by donating , with further contributions during the year.

Avadhi, which is a dialect of Hindi, is primarily from a region in Uttar Pradesh. It was chosen to give the feel of the language spoken during that era. However, the language was diluted, and modern viewers can understand it. The dialogues, which were a combination of three dialects (Avadhi, Bhojpuri and Braj Bhasha) were penned by Hindi writer K. P. Saxena.

Bhanu Athaiya, who won an Oscar for her work in Gandhi (1982), was the costume designer for the film. With a large number of extras, it was difficult for her to make enough costumes. She spent a lot of time researching to lend authenticity to the characters.

Filming 
The film took approximately a year to plan, which included ten months for production and one month for the development of Khan's character, which the first-time producer found tiring. Khan obtained a crew of about 300 people for six months. Due to the lack of comfortable hotels in Bhuj, he hired a newly constructed apartment and furnished it completely for the crew. Security was set up and a special housekeeping team was brought to take care of the crew's needs. Most of the 19th century tools and equipment depicted in the film were lent to the crew by the local villagers. Initially, they did not want to part with their equipment, but after much coaxing, they gave in. They then travelled to different parts of the country to collect the musical instruments used in that day and era.

During the shooting, Gowariker suffered from a slipped disc and had to rest for 30 days. During this period, he had his bed next to the monitor and continued with his work.

The filming schedule spanned the winter and summer, commencing in early January and finishing in mid-June. The actors had to drink frequently and sit in the shade. The schedule was strict. The day began at 6 am, changing into costumes and getting onto the actors' bus, which took them to the sets in Kanuria. The actors, including Khan, all travelled on the same bus. If anyone missed it, it was up to them to reach the sets. One day, Khan was late and missed the actors' bus. That day, his wife Reena, the executive producer, reprimanded him for being late. She told him he had to set an example for the rest of the crew. "If he started coming late, how could she tell the others to come on time?" While on the sets, the actors were given call sheets with the day's timetable such as breakfast, hairstyling, make-up, costumes, etc.

Music

Release 
Before its worldwide release, Khan kept a promise to screen the film to the locals of Bhuj. Lagaan clashed with Anil Sharma's Gadar: Ek Prem Katha, starring Sunny Deol and Ameesha Patel, at the box-office. The film made it to the UK Top 10 after its commercial release. It was the first Indian film to have a nationwide release in China and had its dubbed version released in Italy. With favorable reviews from the French press, Lagaan premiered in Paris on 26 June 2002 and continued to have an unprecedented nine weeks of screening with over 45,000 people watching. It was released in the United States, Canada, France, Germany, Japan, Malaysia, Hong Kong, South Africa and the Middle East with respective vernacular subtitles.

In 2001, Lagaan had a world premiere at the International Indian Film Academy Awards (IIFA) weekend in Sun City, South Africa. The Locarno International Film Festival authorities published the rules of cricket before the film was screened to a crowd which reportedly danced to its soundtrack in the aisles. Lagaan was shown 4 times due to public demand as against the usual norm of showcasing films once at the festival. It subsequently won the Prix du Public Award at the festival. After the film's publicity in Locarno, the director, Gowariker said that distributors from Switzerland, Italy, France, Netherlands, North Africa, Finland and Germany were wanting to purchase the distribution rights. Special screenings were held in Russia, where people were keen to watch the film after its Oscar nomination.

Apart from these screenings, it was shown at the Sundance Film Festival, Cairo International Film Festival, Stockholm International Film Festival, Helsinki Film Festival and the Toronto International Film Festival. The film is available on Netflix.

Home media 
There were two releases for the DVD. The first, as a 2-DVD set, was released on 27 May 2002 in limited regions. It contained subtitles in Arabic, English, Hebrew, Hindi, Turkish and several European languages. It is available in 16:9 Anamorphic widescreen, Dolby Digital 5.1 Surround, progressive 24 frame/s, widescreen and NTSC format. It carried an additional fifteen minutes of deleted scenes, filmographies and trailers.

The second was released as anniversary edition 3-disc DVD box after 6 years of the theatrical release. This also included Chale Chalo which was a documentary on the making of Lagaan, a curtain-raiser on the making of the soundtrack, deleted scenes, trailers, along with other collectibles such as 11 collector cards, a collectible Lagaan coin embossed with the character of Bhuvan, a 35 mm CinemaScope filmstrip hand-cut from the film's filmstrip were bundled with the film. After its release, it became the highest-selling DVD in India, beating Sholay (1975). Chale Chalo – The Lunacy of Film Making, won the National Film Award for Best Exploration/Adventure Film.

A comic book, Lagaan: The Story, along with 2 colouring books, a mask book and a cricket board game were subsequently released to the commercial market. The comic book, available in English and Hindi, was targeted at children between the ages of 6 and 14. At the book's launch, Aamir Khan said that they were keen to turn the film into a comic strip during the pre-production phase itself.

In March 2002, a book titled The Spirit of Lagaan – The Extraordinary Story of the Creators of a Classic was published. It covers the making of the film, describing in detail the setbacks and obstacles that the crew faced while developing the film from concept to its release.

Reception

Box office 
The film initially grossed  worldwide in 2001. This made it the third highest-grossing Hindi film of 2001, behind Kabhi Khushi Kabhie Gham... and Gadar: Ek Prem Katha.

Domestically, Lagaan grossed  in India.

With an overseas gross of 10.84 crore (US$2.2 million) in 2001, it was the year's second highest-grossing Indian film overseas, preceded only by Kabhi Khushi Kabhie Gham.... Lagaans overseas gross included £600,000 in the United Kingdom, US$910,000 in the United States and Canada, and US$180,000 in the Arab states of the Persian Gulf.

In China, where the film released on 16 May 2003, it grossed ¥3million, equivalent to  1.71crore (US$362,500).

At a ticket inflation rate of 5.5 times in 2016, the film's total gross is equivalent to approximately  when adjusted for inflation in 2016.

Critical reception 
Lagaan was met with critical acclaim.  

Sudish Kamath of The Hindu suggested that "the movie is not just a story. It is an experience. An experience of watching something that puts life into you, that puts a cheer on your face, however depressed you might be." The Times of India wrote, "Lagaan has all the attractions of big-sounding A. R. Rahman songs, excellent performances by Aamir Khan... and a successful debut for pretty Gracy Singh. In addition, there is the celebrated David vs. Goliath cricket match, which has the audiences screaming and clapping."

Roger Ebert, writing for the Chicago Sun-Times, gave the film 3.5 out of 4 stars and wrote, "Lagaan is an enormously entertaining movie, like nothing we've ever seen before, and yet completely familiar... At the same time, it's a memory of the films we all grew up on, with clearly-defined villains and heroes, a love-triangle, and even a comic character who saves the day. Lagaan is a well-crafted, hugely entertaining epic that has the spice of a foreign culture." Derek Elley of Variety suggested that it "could be the trigger for Bollywood's long-awaited crossover to non-ethnic markets". Somni Sengupta of The New York Times, described it as "a carnivalesque genre packed with romance, swordplay and improbable song-and-dance routines". Dave Kehr, another New York Times film critic, called Lagaan "a movie that knows its business -- pleasing a broad, popular audience -- and goes about it with savvy professionalism and genuine flair." Kevin Thomas of the Los Angeles Times argued that the film is "an affectionate homage to a popular genre that raises it to the level of an art film with fully drawn characters, a serious underlying theme, and a sophisticated style and point of view."

Peter Bradshaw of The Guardian described the film as "a lavish epic, a gorgeous love story, and a rollicking adventure yarn. Larger than life and outrageously enjoyable, it's got a dash of Spaghetti Western, a hint of Kurosawa, with a bracing shot of Kipling." Kuljinder Singh of the BBC stated that "Lagaan is anything but standard Bollywood fodder, and is the first must-see of the Indian summer. A movie that will have you laughing and crying, but leaving with a smile."

Lagaan was listed as #14 on Channel 4s "50 Films To See Before You Die" and was the only Indian film to be listed. The film was also well-received in China, where its themes resonated with Chinese audiences. It was ranked #55 in Empire magazine's "The 100 Best Films of World Cinema" in 2010. In 2011, John Nugent of the Trenton Independent called the film "a masterpiece ... and what better way to learn a bit about India's colonial experience! History and great entertainment, all rolled into one (albeit long) classic film."

Awards 

Khan and Gowariker went to Los Angeles to generate publicity for the Academy Awards. Khan said, "We just started showing it to whoever we could, even the hotel staff." About India's official entry to the 2002 Oscars, The Daily Telegraph wrote, "A Bollywood film that portrays the British in India as ruthless sadists and Mafia-style crooks has been chosen as Delhi's official entry to the Academy Awards." It added that the film was expected to win the nomination.

On 12 February 2002, Lagaan was nominated for the best foreign language film at the Academy Award nominations ceremony. After the nomination, Khan reacted by saying, "To see the name of the film and actually hear it being nominated was very satisfying". Post-nomination reactions poured in from several parts of the world. USA Today wrote "Hooray for Bollywood, and India's Lagaan". With Sony Pictures Classics distributing the film and Oscar-winning director Baz Luhrmann praising it, Lagaan had a chance to win. The BBC commented that the nomination raised Bollywood hopes that Indian films would become more popular in the US. In India, the nomination was celebrated with news reports about a win bringing in "a great boost for the Indian film industry" and "a Bharat Ratna for Aamir Khan and the status of a 'national film' for Lagaan".

When Lagaan lost the award to the Bosnian film No Man's Land, there was disappointment in India. Khan said, "Certainly we were disappointed. But the thing that really kept us in our spirits was that the entire country was behind us." Filmmaker Mahesh Bhatt criticised the "American film industry" as "insular and the foreign category awards were given just for the sake of it." Gowariker added that "Americans must learn to like our films".

The film won a number of awards at Indian award ceremonies including eight National Film Awards, eight Filmfare Awards, eight Screen Awards and 10 IIFA Awards. Apart from these major awards, it also won awards at other national and international ceremonies.

See also 
 List of Asian historical drama films

References

Further reading 
 Bhatkal, Satyajit (March 2002). The spirit of Lagaan. Mumbai: Popular Prakshan. pp. 243. .

External links
 
 
 Lagaan at Bollywood Hungama

2000s Hindi-language films
2000s historical drama films
2001 films
Cricket films
Films about cricket in India
Films directed by Ashutosh Gowariker
Films scored by A. R. Rahman
Films set in 1893
Films set in the British Raj
Films set in Gujarat
Films shot in Gujarat
History of India on film
Indian historical drama films
Indian sports drama films
Best Popular Film Providing Wholesome Entertainment National Film Award winners
Films whose production designer won the Best Production Design National Film Award
Films that won the Best Audiography National Film Award
Films that won the Best Costume Design National Film Award
Films featuring a Best Choreography National Film Award-winning choreography
2000s sports drama films
2001 drama films
Sony Pictures Classics films